= ONEArmenia =

- Founded: 2012
- Founder: Patrick Sarkissian
- Type: Nonprofit organization
- Purpose: Sustainability, Culture, Technology
- Location: United States, Armenia
- Region served: Armenia, Nagorno-Karabakh
- Method: Funding charitable projects in Armenia that boost the country's development in the sectors of culture and technology.
- Employees: 5
- Volunteers: 14
- Website: Official website

ONEArmenia is a nonprofit organization that promotes travel experience incubation in Armenia. The organization is based in Santa Monica and Yerevan, Armenia, and was founded in 2012 in response to the growing cynicism around donating to charitable causes in Armenia. ONEArmenia runs campaigns that invest in sustainable projects and aim to develop Armenia's technology, tourism sectors and agriculture, primarily through crowdfunding, partnering and collaborating with grassroots organizations and reporting to connect donors with projects. ONEArmenia is a gold-level Guide-star Participant.

== History ==
=== Founding ===
ONEArmenia was founded in 2012 by Patrick Sarkissian as a platform for individuals around the world to invest in Armenia. Sarkissian cited the growth of the domestic Information Technology sector as a sign that Armenia's economy would benefit more from developing the technology and talent of the country than relying on natural resources and services. Sarkissian highlighted the importance of creating a non-profit that would depict Armenia as a contemporary society and attract the global community in order to address the issues of corruption and transparency that were affecting diaspora support of Armenia. The company was founded in 2012 and granted 501(c)(3) status in 2014.

=== Background ===
One of the major reasons for the creation of ONEArmenia began in response to skepticism around sending money to Armenia. While the Armenian Diaspora has historically provided financial support to the country through individual donations and organizations committed to ensuring the economic well-being of Armenia, the perception of corruption has undermined faith in these channels and the financial and governmental institutions handling money. Reports by Transparency International and The World Bank have cited Armenian corruption and patronage networks to be a major hurdle to economic growth and development since its independence in 1991. As a result, communities in the Armenian diaspora have expressed concern and skepticism around the merit of donating financial resources to the country.

In addition to Corruption, many events shaped the sociology-economic structure of the Armenian State during its initial years of independence. The Nagorno-Karabakh War, an ethnic and territorial conflict that took place in the late 1980s to May 1994, an economic blockade of the Armenian border by Turkey and Azerbaijan, a devastating earthquake in Northern Armenia in 1988, and the challenge of building a republic following the fall of the Soviet Union proved challenging in developing a sustainable system of economic development. The campaigns run by ONEArmenia aim to address the lingering consequences of the difficulties faced during those years though specific campaigns that address individual communities. Their goal is not widespread well-being, but cumulative growth through pinpointed investment.

=== Process ===
ONEArmenia selects four projects a year in agriculture, tourism, technology and made-in-Armenia products. The organization funds projects through online promotion and crowdfunding. Campaigns are not aimed at a specific issue or Armenia in general, but address specific communities and interests in Armenia that are otherwise lacking resources or support. Each campaign is advertised through newsletters and social media channels such as Facebook, LinkedIn, Instagram, and Twitter and is driven by individual fundraisers through events and personal donations. ONEArmenia publishes budget and project sheets that detail the total cost of each project. Once a campaign is finished, implementation and lasting impact are communicated in a similar way.

== Partnering organizations ==
ONEArmenia selects implementing partners for each campaign, based on the specific issues a campaign addresses and the resources needed to carry it out. The group has partnered with thirteen different organizations, some on multiple projects.

Partner	Campaign
The Halo Trust	Remove Landmines from Artsakh
American University of Armenia	Let's Protect Armenia from Toxic Pollution
Sistema Armenia	Build Community and Make Music in Armenia
Union of Information Technology Enterprises	Hye Tech Kids
Sahman NGO	Bring on the Buzz Bring Sustainable Farming to Armenia
Hovnanian Foundation	HIKEArmenia
Homeland Development Initiative Foundation	Vardenis Wheat Festival
Oxfam International	Build Sustainable Opportunities for Women Farmers in Tavush Make Armenia Healthy and Nutritious
Children of Armenia Fund	Santas Wanted 2015
Tufenkian Foundation	Support a Safe House in Armenia Build a Kindergarten in Moshatagh Building Health and Hope in Aghavnatun A Wave of Clean water for Armenia
Semina Consulting	Farm-to-Bottle
Aleppo Compatriotic Charitable Organization	Santas Wanted 2016
Armtab	Teach through Technology
